The Russian Second League 1994 was the third edition of Russian Second Division. There were 4 zones with 62 teams starting the competition in total (5 of them were excluded before the end of the season).

Zone West

Overview

Standings

Top goalscorers 
29 goals

 Aslan Goplachev (PFC Spartak Nalchik)
 Igor Tikhonov (FC Tekstilshchik Ivanovo)

24 goals

  Konstantin Kovalenko (FC Kolos Krasnodar)

22 goals

 Aleksandr Khalzov (FC Metallurg Lipetsk)
 Eduard Kugotov (PFC Spartak Nalchik)

19 goals

 Aleksandr Zernov (FC Tekstilshchik Ivanovo)

17 goals

  Vladimir Zinich (FC Fakel Voronezh)

16 goals

  Ihar Fralow (FC Kolos Krasnodar)
 Aleksei Gerasimenko (FC Kuban Krasnodar)

15 goals

 Yuri Vostrukhin (FC Torpedo Taganrog)

Zone Center

Overview

Standings

Top goalscorers 
20 goals

 Oleg Umurzakov (FC Torpedo Volzhsky)

16 goals

 Aleksei Chernov (FC Zvezda Gorodishche)
 Eduard Novozhilov (FC Torpedo Arzamas)

15 goals

 Sergei Budarin (FC Metallurg Novotroitsk)

14 goals

 Mikhail Belov (FC Torpedo Volzhsky)

13 goals

 Igor Syrov (FC Devon Oktyabrsky)

12 goals

 Robert Gay (FC Torpedo Miass)
 Andrei Knyazev (FC Metallurg Magnitogorsk)

11 goals

 Sergei Ilyushin (FC Torpedo Volzhsky)

10 goals

 Andrei Ivanov (FC Gazovik-Gazprom Izhevsk)
 Anatoli Kanishchev (FC Torpedo Arzamas)
 Igor Safonov (FC Metallurg Novotroitsk)

Zone Siberia

Overview

Standings

Top goalscorers 
18 goals

 Ruslan Akhidzhak (FC Tom Tomsk)
 Anatoli Kisurin (FC Dynamo Omsk)

13 goals

 Sergei Chernov (FC Metallurg Novokuznetsk)

12 goals

 Oleg Nikulin (FC Chkalovets Novosibirsk)

11 goals

 Yevgeni Zarva (FC Irtysh Tobolsk)

9 goals

 Yevgeni Shipovskiy (FC Torpedo Rubtsovsk)
 Vladimir Tregub (FC Torpedo Rubtsovsk)

8 goals

 Andrei Bazankov (FC Kuzbass Kemerovo)
 Sergei Galkin (FC Chkalovets Novosibirsk)

7 goals

 Yevgeni Kultayev (FC Shakhtyor Kiselyovsk)
 Vladimir Makeyev (FC Chkalovets Novosibirsk)
 Viktor Sebelev (FC Tom Tomsk)

Zone East

Overview

Standings

Top goalscorers 
34 goals

  Vladislav Kadyrov (FC Sakhalin Kholmsk)

21 goals

 Vadim Belokhonov (FC Metallurg Krasnoyarsk)

20 goals

 Andrei Korovin (FC SKA Khabarovsk)

19 goals

 Yuri Kuznetsov (FC Angara Angarsk)

13 goals

 Denis Laktionov (FC Sakhalin Kholmsk)

11 goals

 Vitali Fedenko (FC Metallurg Krasnoyarsk)
 Aleksandr Kharasakhal (FC Dynamo Yakutsk)
 Igor Khimushkin (FC Dynamo Yakutsk)
 Viktor Rybakov (FC Sakhalin Kholmsk)

10 goals

 Mikhail Semyonov (FC SKA Khabarovsk)

Promotion playoffs
Winners of zones Siberia and East played a home-and-away series for promotion to the 1995 Russian First League.

FC Chkalovets Novosibirsk lost to FC Dynamo Yakutsk in Yakutsk 1:2, won 2:0 in Novosibirsk and were promoted on goal difference.

See also
1994 Russian Top League
1994 Russian First League
1994 Russian Third League

3
1994
Russia
Russia